Babette Cochois also known as Babet Cochois and Barbe Cochois (1723–1780) was a French ballerina and writer, active in Prussia.

Her parentage is unknown. She was the sister of the ballerina Marianne Cochois and the second cousin of Marie Sallé. 

She was engaged at the French Royal Court Theatre of Frederick the Great in Prussia between 1743 and 1749. She was considered a leading artist, and was given the rare privilege by the king to reside in Charlottenburg Palace. In 1743, when the Berlin Opera was inaugurated, she made her debut there. 

In 1749 she married the French writer Jean-Baptiste de Boyer, Marquis d'Argens. She retired as a ballerina, but became active as a writer.

She has been the subject of poems and a famous painting by Antoine Pesne.

Works
  Mémoires pour servir à l'histoire de l'esprit et du cœur, 1744
 Nouveaux mémoires pour servir à l'histoire de l'esprit et du coeur, 1745
 Histoire de l'esprit et du coeur, 1755
 Histoire de l'esprit humain, 1765

References

 Samlaren, : Tidskrift utgifven af Svenska litteratursällskapets arbetsutskott, Utgåva 79–82
 Pierre Gaxotte, Frederick the Great
 Gustav Berthold Volz, Der Grosse Konig
  Barocktheater und barocke Kunst: die Entwicklungsgeschichte der Fest- und Theater-Dekoration in ihrem Verhältnis zur barocken Kunst
 Johann Wilhelm Ludewig Gleim, Ausgewählte Werke
 Gunilla Roempke (1994). Gunilla Roempke. red. Vristens makt – dansös i mätressernas tidevarv. Stockholm: Stockholm Fischer & company. 
 Barbe (genannt Babet oder Babette) Cochois, spätere Marquise d’Argens (1723 oder 1725-1780)

1725 births
1780 deaths
18th-century French ballet dancers
18th-century French writers
18th-century Prussian women
French ballerinas
18th-century French women writers